The Liamone river is a river of Corsica, France. 
The river gave its name to the former French department of Liamone. 
In antiquity, it bore the Latin name Circidius.

Location

It flows through ten communes: Letia, Murzo, Vico, Rosazia, Arbori, Lopigna, Arro, Ambiegna, Coggia and Casaglione.

Valley

The Liamone gives its name to the Liamone landscape, an area of Corsica.
It is the central watershed in this landscape, the others being the  Sagone and Liscia rivers.
These have created a large alluvial plain along the coast.
In the coastal plain the river makes wide meanders.
There are no permanent settlements in the plain, which is unhealthy, apart from a few farms.
The only villages are below the ridge that separates the Liamone from the Cinarca to the south.
The RD81 road runs along the seaside between beaches and wet meadows.

Upstream the reliefs quickly become steep, with thick vegetation.
The sea remains visible, although not the plain, until a high rock barrier below the Cruzinu tributary blocks the view.
The east side of the Liamone gorges, where it is followed by the RD4, is almost completely uninhabited.
The RD1 connecting Cinarca to Vico passes on the opposite side, less rugged and less wooded.

Above the gorges the topography is less rugged and the land is more inhabited, with many villages surrounded by groves of olives and chestnuts.
Above the slopes are covered in pine forest, maquis or grassland.
The villages once had a large population secure from the dangers of the coast, and almost self-sufficient economically.
Today many of the inhabitants have left, but the fortified town of Vico with its tall houses and the Convent of Saint-François still preserve a strong architectural heritage.

History 

There is a legend that three brothers, Liamone, Golo and Tavignano, suffered from the cold in the mountains of the central chain of Corsica.
One day they swore to warm themselves by throwing themselves into the sea. 
Golo and Tavignano reached the sea quickly. 
Liamone, slowed by the granite rocks, struggled. 
The Devil came to his rescue when he swore to give him a soul each year. 
Every year the Liamone or one of its tributaries, the Catena, the Fiume Grosso or the Cruzini, paid this tribute. 
The legend explains the capricious flow of this river and its tributaries, sometimes slow but often impetuous.

Pliny the Elder recorded the town of Charax as being to the West above the Liamone.
This name is no longer in use, and it is possible that he recorded a fortification as a town.

Hydrology

Measurements of the river flow were taken at the Pont de Truggia station in Arbori  from 1969 to 2021.
The maximum daily flow was  recorded on 3 November 2000.

Tributaries

The rivers Cruzzini (28 km) and Guagno (19 km) are tributaries of the Liamone.
The following streams (ruisseaux) are also tributaries of the Liamone (ordered by length) and sub-tributaries:

 Catena: 
 Tuccarellu: 
 Mozzu: 
 Lancone: 
 Saliceu: 
 Botaro: 
 Barbaraccio: 
 Calzatoghiu: 
 Chiusellu: 
 Finucchiaja: 
 Forca: 
 Cuvesine: 
 Pangatu: 
 Chiusellu: 
 Acqua Fredda: 
 Elbica: 
 Arbori: 
 Canali: 
 Tigliu: 
 Petraghiu: 
 Frassetu: 
 Tevé: 
 Alena: 
 Trelica: 
 Biegna: 
 Modignu: 
 Arbillari: 
 Forcioli: 
 Mela: 
 Corbari: 
 Lavandacciu: 
 Pantani: 
 Meloni: 
 Surbellu: 
 Aculaghiu: 
 Fughicchie:

References

Sources

Rivers of Corse-du-Sud
Rivers of France
Coastal basins of the Mediterranean Sea in Corsica